The Marston House is a historic house at 429 Main Street in Clarendon, Arkansas.  It is a single-story wood-frame structure, five bays wide, with a side gable roof and a projecting gabled portico sheltering the center entrance.  The portico is supported by paired columns, and the entrance is flanked by sidelight windows and topped by a transom.  Built in 1870, this is one of Clarendon's oldest surviving houses, and a fine local example of Greek Revival architecture.

The house was listed on the National Register of Historic Places in 1984.

See also
National Register of Historic Places listings in Monroe County, Arkansas

References

Houses on the National Register of Historic Places in Arkansas
Greek Revival houses in Arkansas
Houses completed in 1870
Houses in Monroe County, Arkansas
National Register of Historic Places in Monroe County, Arkansas